Miryam Romero Fernández (1963 – 12 June 2022) was a Spanish journalist and news anchor.

Biography 
Romero was born in Jaén in 1963; she later moved with her family to Talavera de la Reina (Toledo), at the age of two where she studied at the Colegio Madres Agustinas, a school run by the Hermanos Maristas and then later in the IES Padre Juan de Mariana. Later she received her Bachelor's degree in information science from the Complutense University of Madrid.

She dedicated most of her career to radio and television broadcasting, working on live broadcasts for COPE, Antena 3 Radio (1985–1988) and TVE (1988–1989). While working for Antena 3 (1989–2020) she was the host of Antena 3 Noticias at 3:00 pm since the beginning of the 1990s where she worked with Luis Herrero, Roberto Arce and Pedro Piqueras. Later, she moved to working behind the cameras as editor and subdirector of the 9:00pm news, hosted by Vicente Vallés until December 2020  when she took an incentivized retirement plan from Atresmedia.

She was married with three children. She died 12 June 2022 in Madrid due to complications associated with leukemia.

References 

1963 births
2022 deaths
Spanish women television presenters
Spanish women journalists
Complutense University of Madrid alumni
People from Jaén, Spain
Deaths from leukemia